Bennett Nāmākēhā-o-kalani (c. 1799–1860) was a Hawaiian high chief, uncle of Queen Emma of Hawaii, and first husband of Queen Kapiolani. His first name is often given as Benjamin, Beneli, or Beniki.

Life
He and his brother George Naea were sons of High Chief Kamaunu and High Chiefess Kukaeleiki, the daughter of Kalauawa from the royal line of Kauaian chiefs. Kukaeleiki was also cousin of Queen Keōpūolani. Nāmākēhā was also said to have been descended from Kalanawaa of Oahu and High Chiefess Kuaenaokalani of Maui who held the exalted kapu rank of Kekapupoʻohoʻolewaikalā (a head so sacred that it could not be exposed to the sun except at dawn).
His name was the same as the high chief who rebelled against Kamehameha I during the end of his military career in 1796. His brother Naʻea was the father of Queen Emma.

He was a member of the House of Nobles from about 1848 through 1855. By 1851 the House of Nobles consisted only of petty chiefs called Kaukaualiʻi.  Nāmākēhā was inferior to the aliʻi nui (High Chiefs). Kaukaualiʻi were only descended from famous fathers while aliʻi nui claim parentage of mother of the highest rank.

Prior to 1852, he was married to Halauwai and later Lydia Piʻia, daughter of Kekaikuihala, the daughter of Nuhi and Kaohelelani. With Halauwai, he had a son Hinau who married Kamakaaiau, an attendant of Queen Emma. With Piʻia, he had another son named Kahaekalaunu, who died in infancy.
On March 8, 1852 he married Kapiʻolani, daughter of Kūhiō Kalanianaʻole and Kinoiki Kekaulike. His second wife was only eighteen years old while he was more than thirty years her senior. Through that marriage she became Queen Emma's aunt and nurse to her son Prince Albert Edward Kauikeaouli. Nāmākēhā and Kapiʻolani had no children. For his health the couple voyaged for months on The Morning Star, a missionary vessel, among the Gilbert Islands, but in vain, for Nāmākēhā died on December 27, 1860, at Honolulu. His widow later remarried to Kalākaua and became the Queen consort of Hawaii in 1874.

Initially buried in the Pohukaina Tomb, located on grounds of ʻIolani Palace, his remains were later transported along with those of other royals in a midnight torchlight procession on October 30, 1865, to the newly constructed Royal Mausoleum at Mauna ʻAla in the Nuʻuanu Valley. In 1904, after the Mausoleum building became too crowded, the coffins belonging to Robert Crichton Wyllie and the relatives of Queen Emma including Nāmākēhā's were moved to the newly built Wylie Tomb. The name "Bennet Namakeha" was inscribed on the ʻewa (west) side of the monument above his final resting place.

His line died out with his granddaughter Stella Keomailani (1866–1927), daughter of Hinau and Kamakaaiau, who was married to James Dawson Cockett and later to Edwin K. Kea.

References

Bibliography
 
 
 
 
 
 
 
 
 
 
 

1799 births
1860 deaths
Royalty of the Hawaiian Kingdom
Hawaiian Kingdom politicians
Members of the Hawaiian Kingdom House of Nobles
Burials at the Royal Mausoleum (Mauna ʻAla)